Emergency War Plan may refer to the following: 

 Military operation planning 
 Emergency management practices in the case of war

Examples include:

 United States war plans (1945–1950) were developed for the contingency of a war with the Soviet Union

Disaster management
Natural disasters